Martin Vunk (born 21 August 1984) is a retired Estonian professional footballer who played as a midfielder.

Club career
Vunk was named the Meistriliiga Player of the Year for his performances for Flora in 2008. On 21 November 2009, he signed a two-year loan deal with Syrianska. On 5 January 2011, he signed a one and a half-year contract with Nea Salamis Famagusta, previously released for that deal by Flora. On 25 July 2012, he signed a two-year contract with the Greek club Panachaiki.

On 9 February 2013, he signed a one-year contract with Sillamäe Kalev.

On 22 February 2014, he signed a one-year contract with Nõmme Kalju.

On 9 December 2014, he signed a one-year contract with Persija Jakarta. However, due to financial trouble the 2015 Indonesia Super League season was cancelled and in the end of May Vunk released himself of the contract.

International career
On 27 February 2008, he debuted for Estonia in a friendly match against Poland, when he came on as a substitute in the 67th minute. He instantly became a regular and was the only player to appear in all 14 matches for the team in that year.
On 6 September 2011, Vunk scored his first International goal for Estonia in a 4–1 victory over Northern Ireland after being very close to his first international goal in the previous game against Slovenia.

International goals
Estonia score listed first, score column indicates score after each Vunk goal.

Honours

Club
Flora
 Meistriliiga: 2002
 Estonian Cup: 2008–09, 2008–09
 Estonian Supercup: 2002

Syrianska
 Superettan: 2010

Individual
 Meistriliiga Player of the Year: 2008

References

External links
 
 
 
 
 
 

1984 births
Living people
Sportspeople from Tartu
Estonian footballers
FC Warrior Valga players
Meistriliiga players
FC Flora players
Nea Salamis Famagusta FC players
Syrianska FC players
Panachaiki F.C. players
Cypriot First Division players
Cypriot Second Division players
Superettan players
Football League (Greece) players
Estonia international footballers
Estonia under-21 international footballers
Estonian expatriate footballers
Expatriate footballers in Greece
Expatriate footballers in Sweden
Estonian expatriate sportspeople in Sweden
Expatriate footballers in Cyprus
Estonian expatriate sportspeople in Cyprus
Liga 1 (Indonesia) players
Expatriate footballers in Indonesia
Pärnu JK Vaprus players
Association football midfielders
FC Kuressaare players